The history of New Mexico is based on archaeological evidence, attesting to the varying cultures of humans occupying the area of New Mexico since approximately 9200 BCE, and written records. The earliest peoples had migrated from northern areas of North America after leaving Siberia via the Bering Land Bridge. Artifacts and architecture demonstrate ancient complex cultures in this region.

The first written records of the region were made by the Spanish conquistadors, who encountered Native American Pueblos when they explored the area in the 16th century. Since that time, the Spanish Empire, Mexico, and the United States (since 1787) have claimed control of the area.

The area was governed as New Mexico Territory until 1912, when it was admitted as a state. The relatively isolated state had an economy dependent on mining. Its residents and government suffered from a reputation for corruption and extreme traditionalism. New Mexico introduced the Atomic Age in 1945, as the first nuclear weapons were developed by the federal government in the research center it established at Los Alamos. Ethnically, New Mexico's population consists of a mixture of Native Americans, Hispanics, and Anglos.

Native American settlements
Human occupation of New Mexico stretches back at least 11,000 years to the hunter-gatherer Clovis culture. They left evidence of their campsites and stone tools. After the invention of agriculture, the land was inhabited by the Ancestral Puebloans, who built houses out of stone or adobe bricks. They experienced a Golden Age around AD 1000, but climate change led to migration and cultural evolution. From those people arose the historic Pueblo peoples who lived primarily along the few major rivers. The most important rivers are the Rio Grande, the Pecos, the Canadian, the San Juan, and the Gila.

Pueblos
The Pueblo people built a flourishing sedentary culture in the 13th century A.D., constructing small towns in the valley of the Rio Grande and pueblos nearby. By about 700 to 900 AD, the Pueblo began to abandon ancient pit houses dug in cliffs and to construct rectangular rooms arranged in apartment-like structures. By 1050 AD, they had developed planned villages composed of large terraced buildings, each with many rooms. These apartment-house villages were often constructed on defensive sites- on ledges of massive rock, on flat summits, or on steep-sided mesas, locations that would afford the Anasazi protection from their Northern enemies. The largest of these villages, Pueblo Bonito, in the Chaco Canyon of New Mexico, contained around 700 rooms in five stories and may have housed as many as 1000 persons. No larger apartment-house type construction would be seen on the continent until 19th century Chicago and New York. Then, around 1150, Chaco Anasazi society began to unravel.

Long before the Spanish arrival, descendants of the Anasazi were using irrigation canals, check dams and hillside terracing as techniques for bringing water to what had for centuries been an arid, agriculturally marginal area. At the same time, the ceramics became more elaborate, cotton replaced yucca fiber as the main clothing material and basket weaving became more artistic.

The Spanish encountered Pueblo civilization and elements of the Athabaskans in the 16th century. Cabeza de Vaca in 1535, one of only four survivors of the Panfilo de Narvaez expedition of 1527, tells of hearing Indians talk about fabulous cities somewhere in New Mexico. Fray Marcos de Niza enthusiastically identified these as the fabulously rich Seven Cities of Cíbola, the mythical seven cities of gold. Francisco Vásquez de Coronado led a massive expedition to find these cities in 1540–1542. The Spanish maltreatment of the Pueblo and Athabaskan people that started with their explorations of the upper Rio Grande valley led to hostility between the indigenous peoples and the Spanish which lasted for centuries.

The three largest pueblos of New Mexico are Zuñi, Santo Domingo, and Laguna. There are three different languages spoken by the pueblos.

Athabaskans-Apachean
The Navajo and Apache peoples are members of the large Athabaskan language family, which includes peoples in Alaska and Canada, and along the Pacific Coast.

The historic peoples encountered by the Europeans did not make up unified tribes in the modern sense, as they were highly decentralized, operating in bands of a size adapted to their semi-nomadic cultures. From the 16th to the 19th centuries, the European explorers, missionaries, traders and settlers referred to the different groups of Apache and Navajo by various names, often associated with distinctions of language or geography. These Athabaskan peoples identified themselves as Diné, which means "the people". The Navajo and Apache made up the largest non-Pueblo Indian group in the Southwest. These two tribes led nomadic lifestyles and spoke the same language.

Some experts estimate that the semi-nomadic Apache were active in New Mexico in the 13th century. Spanish records indicated that they traded with the Pueblo. Various bands or tribes participated in the Southwestern Revolt against the Spanish in the 1680s. By the early 18th century the Spanish had built a series of over 25 forts to protect themselves and subjugated populations from the traditional raiding parties of the Athabaskan.

The Navajo Nation, with more than 300,000 citizens the largest federally recognized tribe in the United States, is concentrated in present-day northwestern New Mexico and northeastern Arizona. The Mescalero Apache live east of the Rio Grande. The Jicarilla Apache live west of the Rio Grande. The Chiricahua Apache lived in southwestern New Mexico and southeastern  Arizona until the late 19th century.

Colonial period

Spanish exploration and colonization

Francisco Vásquez de Coronado assembled an enormous expedition at Compostela, Mexico in 1540–1542, to explore and find the mythical Seven Golden Cities of Cibola, as described by Álvar Núñez Cabeza de Vaca, who had just arrived from his eight-year ordeal of survival. De Vaca traveled mostly overland from Florida to Mexico. He and three companions were the only survivors of the Pánfilo de Narváez expedition of June 17, 1527 to Florida, losing 80 horses and several hundred explorers. These four survivors had spent eight arduous years getting to Sinaloa, Mexico on the Pacific coast, and had visited many Indian tribes.

Coronado and his supporters sank a fortune in this ill-fated enterprise. They took 1,300 horses and mules for riding and packing, and hundreds of head of sheep and cattle as a portable food supply. Coronado's party found several adobe pueblos (towns) in 1541 but no rich cities of gold. Further widespread expeditions found no fabulous cities anywhere in the Southwest or Great Plains. A dispirited and now poor Coronado and his party began their journey back to Mexico, leaving New Mexico behind. it is likely that some of Coronado's horses escaped, to be captured and adopted for use by Plains Indians. Over the next two centuries, they made horses at the center of their nomadic cultures. Only two of Coronado's horses were mares.

More than 50 years after Coronado, Juan de Oñate came north from the Valley of Mexico with 500 Spanish settlers and soldiers and 7,000 head of livestock, founding the first Spanish settlement in New Mexico on July 11, 1598. The governor named the settlement San Juan de los Caballeros. This means "Saint John of the Knights". San Juan was in a small valley. Nearby the Chama River flows into the Rio Grande. Oñate pioneered El Camino Real de Tierra Adentro, "The Royal Road of the Interior Land," a 700-mile (1,100 km) trail from the rest of New Spain to his remote colony. Oñate was appointed as the first governor of the new province of Santa Fe de Nuevo México. Although he intended to achieve the total subjugation of the Natives, Oñate noted in 1599 that the Pueblo "live very much the same as [the Spanish] do, in houses with two and three terraces."

The Native Americans at Acoma revolted against this Spanish encroachment but faced severe suppression. In battles with the Acomas, Oñate lost 11 soldiers and two servants, killed hundreds of Indians, and punished every man over 25 years of age by the amputation of their left foot. The Franciscans found the Pueblo people increasingly unwilling to consent to baptism by newcomers who continued to demand food, clothing and labor. Acoma is also known as the oldest continually inhabited city in the United States.
 
Oñate's capital of San Juan proved to be vulnerable to Apache (probably Navajo) attacks. Governor Pedro de Peralta moved the capital and established the settlement of Santa Fe in 1610 at the foot of the Sangre de Cristo Mountains. Santa Fe is the oldest state capital city in the United States. Peralta built the Palace of the Governors in 1610. Although the colony failed to prosper, some missions survived. Spanish settlers arrived at the site of Albuquerque in the mid-17th century. Missionaries attempted to convert the natives to Christianity, but had little success.

Contemporary scholars believe that the objective of Spanish rule of New Mexico (and all other northern lands) was the full exploitation of the native population and resources. As Frank McNitt writes,

Governors were a greedy and rapacious lot whose single-minded interest was to wring as much personal wealth from the province as their terms allowed. They exploited Indian labor for transport, sold Indian slaves in New Spain, and sold Indian products ... and other goods manufactured by Indian slave labor.

The exploitative nature of Spanish rule resulted in their conducting nearly continuous raids and reprisals against the nomadic Indian tribes on the borders, especially the Apache, Navajo, and Comanche.

Franciscan missionaries accompanied Oñate to New Mexico; afterward there was a continuing struggle between secular and religious authorities. Both colonists and the Franciscans depended upon Indian labor, mostly the Pueblo,the sedentary people of the Rio Grande valley, and competed with each other to control a decreasing Indian population. The Indians suffered high mortality because of infectious diseases unknowingly brought by the Spaniards, to which they had no immunity, and the exploitation that disrupted their societies. The struggle between the Franciscans and the civil government came to a head in the late 1650s. Governor Bernardo Lopez de Mendizabal and his subordinate Nicolas de Aguilar forbade the Franciscans to punish Indians or employ them without pay. They granted the Pueblo permission to practice their traditional dances and religious ceremonies. After the Franciscans protested, Lopez and Aguilar were arrested, turned over to the Inquisition, and tried in Mexico City. Thereafter, the Franciscans reigned supreme in the province. Pueblo dissatisfaction with the rule of the clerics was the main cause of the Pueblo revolt.

The Spanish in New Mexico were never able to gain dominance over the Indian peoples, who lived among and surrounded them. The isolated colony of New Mexico was characterized by "elaborate webs of ethnic tension, friendship, conflict, and kinship" among Indian groups and Spanish colonists. Because of the weakness of New Mexico, "rank-and-file settlers in outlying areas had to learn to coexist with Indian neighbors without being able to keep them subordinate." The Pueblo Indians were the first group to challenge Spanish rule significantly. Later the nomadic Indians, especially the Comanche, mounted attacks that weakened the Spanish.

Pueblo Revolt of 1680

Many of the Pueblo people harbored hostility toward the Spanish, due to their oppression of the Indians and prohibition of their practice of traditional religion. The economies of the pueblos (towns) were disrupted, as the people were forced to labor on the encomiendas of the colonists. The Spanish introduced new farming implements which the Pueblo adopted and provided some measure of security against Navajo and Apache raiding parties. The Pueblo lived in relative peace with the Spanish from the founding of the northern New Mexico colony in 1598.

In the 1670s, drought swept the region, causing famine among the Pueblo, and attracting increased attacks from neighboring nomadic tribes trying to gain food supplies. Spanish soldiers were unable to defend the settlements adequately. At the same time, European-introduced diseases caused high mortality among the natives, decimating their communities. Dissatisfied with the protective powers of the Spanish Crown and its god of the Catholic Church, the Pueblo returned to their old gods. This provoked a wave of repression by New Mexico governor Juan Francisco Treviño, as well as the Franciscan missionaries. Following his arrest on a charge of witchcraft and subsequent release, Popé (or Po-pay) planned and orchestrated the Pueblo Revolt.

After being freed, Popé moved to Taos and planned a Pueblo war against the Spaniards. He dispatched runners to all the Pueblos carrying knotted cords, the knots signifying the number of days remaining until the appointed day for them to rise together against the Spaniards. Hearing that the Spaniards had learned of these plans, Popé ordered the attacks advanced to August 13. The Spanish were driven from all but the southern portion of New Mexico. They set up a temporary capital at El Paso while making preparations to reconquer the rest of the province.

The retreat of the Spaniards left New Mexico controlled by the Indians. Popé ordered the Indians, under penalty of death, to burn or destroy crosses and other Catholic religious imagery, as well as any other vestige of the Spanish culture. He also wanted to destroy Spanish livestock and fruit trees. Kivas (rooms for religious rituals) were reopened, and Popé ordered all Indians to bathe in soap made of yucca root. He forbade the planting of Spanish crops of wheat and barley. Popé ordered those Indians married by the rites of the Catholic Church to dismiss their wives, and take others under their traditional ways. He took control of the Governor's Palace as ruler of the Pueblo, and collected tribute from each Pueblo until his death in 1688.

Following their success, the different Pueblo tribes, separated by hundreds of miles and six different languages, quarreled as to who would occupy Santa Fe and rule over the territory. These power struggles, combined with raids from nomadic tribes and a seven-year drought, weakened the Pueblo strength. In July 1692, Diego de Vargas led Spanish forces that surrounded Santa Fe, where he called on the Indians to surrender, promising clemency if they would swear allegiance to the king of Spain and return to the Christian faith. The Indian leaders gathered in Santa Fe, met with De Vargas, and agreed to peace.

While developing Santa Fe as a trade center, the returning settlers founded Albuquerque in 1706, naming for the viceroy of New Spain, the Duke of Alburquerque. Prior to its founding, Albuquerque consisted of several haciendas and communities along the lower Rio Grande. The settlers constructed the Iglesia de San Felipe Neri (1706). Development of ranching and some farming in the 18th century were the basis for the culture of many of the state's still-flourishing Hispanics.

While the Pueblo achieved a short-lived independence from the Spaniards, they gained a measure of freedom from future Spanish efforts to impose their culture and religion following the reconquest. The Spanish issued substantial land grants to each Pueblo, and appointed a public defender to protect the rights of the Indians and argue their legal cases in the Spanish courts.

Spanish relations with the natives

From the date of the founding of New Mexico, the Pueblo people and Spanish settlers were plagued by hostile relationships with nomadic and semi-nomadic Navajo, Apache, Ute, and Comanche people. These tribes raided the more sedentary peoples for livestock, food supplies and stores, and captives to ransom or use as slaves.

The southwestern natives developed a horse culture, raiding Spanish ranches and missions for their horses, and ultimately breeding and raising their own herds. The native horse culture quickly spread throughout western America. Navajo and Apache raids for horses on Spanish and Pueblo settlements began in the 1650s or earlier. Through the Pueblo Revolt of 1680, the Indians acquired many horses. By the 1750s the Plains Indians horse culture was well established from Texas to Alberta, Canada. The Navajo, in addition to being among the first mounted Native Americans in the U.S., were unique in developing a pastoral culture based on sheep stolen from the Spanish. By the early 18th century, the Navajo households typically owned herds of sheep.

Comancheria

After the Pueblo revolt, the Comanche posed the most serious threat to the Spanish settlers. Scholar Hämäläinen (2008) argues that from the 1750s to the 1850s, the Comanche were the dominant group in the Southwest, and they ruled a domain known as Comancheria. Hämäläinen calls it an empire. Confronted with Spanish, Mexican, French, and American outposts on their periphery in New Mexico, Texas, Louisiana, and Mexico, they worked to increase their own safety, prosperity and power. The Comanche used their military power to obtain supplies and labor from the Americans, Mexicans, and Puebloans through cunning, tribute, and kidnappings. The Comanche empire was primarily an economic construction, based on a raiding, hunting and pastoral economy and rooted in an extensive commercial network that facilitated long-distance trade. Dealing with subordinate natives, the Comanche spread their language and culture across the region. In terms of governance, the Comanche created a decentralized political system, They created a hierarchical social organization in which young warriors could advance through their success in war.

In 1706, colonists in New Mexico first recorded the Comanche; by 1719 they were raiding the colony as well as other Native peoples. The other tribes had primarily raided for plunder, but the Comanche introduced a new level of violence to the conflict. The Comanche were pure nomads, well mounted by the 1730s. They were more elusive and mobile than the semi-nomadic Apache and Navajo, who were dependent upon agriculture or herding for part of their livelihoods. The Comanche both raided and traded with the Spanish settlers. They were especially prominent at the annual Taos trade fair, where they peacefully exchanged hides, meat and captives, often before or after raiding other settlements.

The Governor of New Mexico Tomás Vélez Cachupín, who administered the province from 1749 to 1754 and from 1762 to 1767 led a successful expedition against the Comanche, but the Comanche continued to raid, endangering the survival of colonial New Mexico, stripping the settlements of horses, forcing the abandonment of many settlements, and in 1778 killing 127 Spanish settlers and Pueblo people. Punitive expeditions by the Spanish and their native allies against the Comanche were usually ineffective, but in 1779 a Spanish and Puebloan force of 560 men, led by Juan Bautista de Anza, surprised a Comanche village near Pueblo, Colorado and killed Cuerno Verde (Green Horn), the most prominent of the Comanche war leaders. The Comanche subsequently sued for peace with New Mexico, joined the New Mexicans in expeditions against their common enemy, the Apache, and turned their attention to raiding Spanish settlements in Texas and northern Mexico. The New Mexicans on their part took care not to re-antagonize the Comanche and lavished gifts on them. The peace between New Mexico and the Comanche endured until the United States conquest of the province in 1846 during the Mexican–American War.

Peace with the Comanche stimulated a growth in the population of New Mexico; settlements expanded eastward on to the Great Plains. The inhabitants of these new settlements were mostly genizaros, natives and the descendants of natives who had been ransomed from the Comanche. Navajo and Apache raids continued to affect the territory. The Navajo were defeated in 1864 by Kit Carson, but the Apache leader Geronimo did not surrender until 1886. The Ute had earlier allied with the New Mexicans for mutual protection against the Comanche.

The Comanche empire collapsed after their villages were repeatedly decimated by epidemics of smallpox and cholera, especially in 1849; their population plunged from about 20,000 in the 18th century to 1,500 by 1875, when they surrendered to the U.S. Government. The Comanche no longer had the manpower to deal with the U.S. Army and the wave of white settlers who encroached on their region in the decades after the Mexican–American War ended in 1848.

U.S. exploration
Following Lewis and Clark, many men started exploring and trapping in the western parts of the United States. Sent out in 1806, Lt. Zebulon Pike's orders were to find the headwaters of the Arkansas and Red rivers. He was to explore the southwestern part of the Louisiana Purchase. In 1807, when Pike and his party crossed into the San Luis Valley of northern New Mexico they were arrested and taken to Santa Fe, and then sent south to Chihuahua where they appeared before the Commandant General Salcedo. After four months of diplomatic negotiations, Pike and his party were returned to the United States, under protest, across the Red River at Natchitoches.

Mexican territory

Revolution and Mexican Independence

The decade that led up to independence was a painful period in the history of Mexico. In 1810 catholic priest Miguel Hidalgo instigated a war for independence in central Mexico, a struggle that quickly took on the character of a class war. The following year, military captain Las Casas instigated a coup within the Imperial regime. Sympathizing with the poor underclass, Las Casas opened up a line of dialogue with the revolutionaries. This caused the Spanish elite to instigate its own counter coup and executed Las Casas. For years afterward the regime failed to regain coherency and the mandate to administer. These ideological struggles affected peripheral New Mexico much less than they did the national center, but it resulted in a sense of alienation with central authority.

Furthermore, in 1818 a longstanding peace between the settled communities of New Mexico and the neighboring nomadic Indian tribes broke down. Just a month after swearing loyalty to the new Mexican government in 1821, governor Melgares led a raid into Navajo country.

For these reasons it is highly surprising that the transition from Spanish to Mexican rule occurred as peacefully as it did. In New Mexico the event passed with few shows of enthusiasm or partisanship.  Festivals were largely a lackluster affair and held only at the behest of the revolutionary government which expressed that they should be held, "in all the form and with the magnificence that the oaths of allegiance to the Kings have previously been read". But there was no renewed civil war and the provisional government was given the grudging support of most of society.

Trade along the Santa Fe Trail was opened following Mexican independence. With this trade came a new influx of citizens from the United States. Prior to independence, the estranjeros (foreigners) were not allowed to participate in receiving land grants, but now, along with the open trade, a few would become participating owners of these merceds (grants).

Federalist stage

In 1824 a new constitution was drafted, that established Mexico as a federalist republic. A generally liberal-minded atmosphere that had pervaded Mexico since independence led to generous grants of local autonomy and limited central power. New Mexico in particular was able to take advantage and to carve out significant privileges in this new system. Classified as a territory rather than a state, it had reduced representation in the national government but broad local autonomy.  Because of the advanced age of New Mexican society and its relative sophistication,  it was uniquely placed to take advantage of its position as a frontier but still effecting influence in the rest of the country.

One of the defining features of the Mexican period in the history of New Mexico was the attempt to instill a nationalist sentiment.  This was a tremendous challenge considering the nature of identity in Mexico during the Spanish empire. Under the official dictates of the empire, subjects were classified in terms of ethnicity, class and position in society. These legal distinctions kept groups separate, and movement between groups was regulated. Ethnic Europeans made up the upper crust of this system, with Peninsulars—those born in Spain itself—comprising the true elite, while Mexican-born Europeans, the creoles, were ranked just below them. At the bottom were the masses of Indians and Mestizos, who had few legal rights and protections against the abuse of their superiors.

In contrast, the new 'Mexican' elite attempted to create a common identity among all classes and ethnicities.  Embracing a wide range of peoples and cultures, from nomadic Indians to the high society of Mexico City, this ambitious undertaking met with mixed success. In New Mexico, there was already a highly structured and differentiated society at the time of independence, which was unique along the Mexican frontier. At the top were ethnic Europeans who then merged with a large community of Hispanics. The more Indian blood you possessed, the lower on the social scale you tended to reside until the bottom was made of settled Pueblo communities and the nomadic Indians who existed outside of the polity.

Nationalists attempted to establish equality, if only legally, between these disparate groups. The local autonomy New Mexicans had established inhibited these endeavors and throughout the Mexican period the elite continued to maintain their privileges. Nevertheless, the inhabitants of New Mexico were able to adapt their old identity as Spanish subjects to Mexican nationals. Instead of a purely modern liberal sense of identity, this adapted Spanish feudalism to a geographic area. The evidence of this success in nationalism can be seen in the Pueblo myth of Montezuma. This held that the original Aztec homeland lay in New Mexico, and the original king of the Aztecs was a Pueblo. This creates a symbolic, and completely artificial, connection between the Mexican center and an isolated frontier society.

Centralist stage and collapse

The federalist and liberal atmosphere that pervaded Mexican thought since independence fell apart in the mid-1830s. Across the political spectrum there was the perception that the previous system had failed and needed readjustment. This led to the dissolution of the 1824 constitution and the drafting of a new one based on centralist lines. As Mexico drifted farther and farther toward despotism, the national project began to fail and the nation fell into a crisis.

Along the frontier, formerly autonomous societies reacted aggressively to a newly assertive central government. The most independent province, Texas, declared its independence in 1835, triggering the sequence of events that led directly to Mexico's collapse. The Revolt of 1837 in New Mexico itself overthrew and executed the centrally appointed governor and demanded increased regional authority. This revolt was defeated within New Mexican society itself by Manuel Armijo. This was motivated not by nationalist sentiment but by the class antagonism within New Mexican society. When central rule was reestablished, it was done so on Armijo's lines (he became governor) and he ruled the province with even greater autonomy than any other time during the Mexican period.

As the situation within central Mexico fell further and further into confusion, New Mexico began to draw closer economically to the United States. This was epitomized in the growth in traffic and prominence of the Santa Fe Trail as a means of communication and trade. In the mid-1830s New Mexico began to function as a trading hub between the United States, central Mexico and Mexican California. Merchants making their way over the Great Plains would stop in Santa Fe, where they would meet with their counterparts from Los Angeles and Mexico City. The result was that as central Mexico fell into turmoil, New Mexico grew economically and trade ties strengthened with the United States.

In 1845 the governorship of Armijo was interrupted when the regime of Antonio López de Santa Anna replaced him as governor with political outsider Mariano Martínez de Lejanza. In the growing threat of war with the United States, the national center sought to bring the frontier under tight control as it is there that any war would be fought. Most New Mexicans distrusted the central government by now but that soon turned to fury when, one year into his reign, Martinez sparked a needless war with a neighboring Indian tribe out of incompetence and naïveté. To prevent revolution, Martinez was swiftly removed and Armijo reinstated, but any confidence the central government still enjoyed was completely destroyed.

The following year rumors arrived in New Mexico that the Mexican government was planning on selling the territory to the United States. There was so little trust in the central government by this point that instead of investigating these rumors (which were completely false) leading members of New Mexican society drafted a threat of secession to the government. This stated that if any such actions were taken then New Mexico would declare independence as La República Mexicana del Norte. It was not until invading American troops reached New Mexico in August 1846 that they learned of war with the United States.

Texas

The Republic of Texas seceded from Mexico in 1836 and claimed but never controlled territory as far south and west as the Rio Grande. While most of the northwestern territory was then the Comancheria, it would have included Santa Fe and divided New Mexico. The only attempt to realize the claim was Texian President Mirabeau Lamar's Santa Fe Expedition, which failed spectacularly. The wagon train, supplied for a journey of about half the actual distance between Austin and Santa Fe, followed the wrong river, back-tracked, and arrived in New Mexico to find the Mexican governor restored and hostile. Surrendering peaceably upon a pledge to be allowed to return the way they came, the Texians found themselves bound at gunpoint and their execution put to a vote of the garrison. By one vote, they were spared and marched south to Chihuahua and then Mexico City.

United States control

Mexican–American War

In 1846, during the Mexican–American War, American General Stephen W. Kearny marched down the Santa Fe Trail and entered Santa Fe without opposition to establish a joint civil and military government. Kearny's invasion force consisted of his army of 300 cavalry soldiers of the First Dragoons, about 1,600 Missouri volunteers in the First and Second Regiments of Fort Leavenworth, Missouri Mounted Cavalry, and the 500 man Mormon Battalion. Kearny appointed Charles Bent, a Santa Fe trail trader living in Taos, as acting civil governor. He then divided his forces into four commands: one, under Colonel Sterling Price, appointed military governor, was to occupy and maintain order in New Mexico with his approximately 800 troops; a second group under Colonel Alexander William Doniphan, with a little over 800 troops was ordered to capture El Paso, in the state of Chihuahua, Mexico and then join up with General Wool; the third, of about 300 dragoons mounted on mules, Kearny led under his command to California. The Mormon Battalion, mostly marching on foot under Lt. Col. Philip St. George Cooke, was directed to follow Kearny with wagons to establish a new southern route to California.

When Kearny encountered Kit Carson, traveling East and bearing messages that California had already been subdued, he sent nearly 200 of his dragoons back to New Mexico. In California, about 400 soldiers of the California Battalion under John C. Fremont and another 400 soldiers under Commodore Robert Stockton of the U.S. Navy and Marines had taken control of the approximately 7,000 Californios from San Diego to Sacramento. New Mexico territory, which then included present-day Arizona, was under undisputed United States control, but the exact boundary with Texas was uncertain. Texas initially claimed all land North of the Rio Grande; but later agreed to the present boundaries.

Kearny protected citizens in the new US territories under a form of martial law called the Kearny Code; it was essentially Kearny and the U.S. Army's promise that the US would respect existing religious and legal claims, and maintain law and order. The Kearny Code became one of the bases of New Mexico's legal code during its territorial period, which was one of the longest in United States history. Many of the provisions remain substantially unchanged today.

Kearny's arrival in New Mexico was almost without conflict; the governor surrendered without battle. The Mexican authorities took the money they could find and retreated south into Mexico. Nonetheless, the U.S. occupation was resented by the New Mexicans. Provisional governor Charles Bent, a longtime resident of New Mexico, implored U.S. army officers to "respect the rights of the inhabitants" and predicted "serious consequences" if measures were not taken to prevent abuses. His warning was prophetic, as New Mexican and Pueblo Indian rebels were soon to begin the Taos Revolt.

On January 19, 1847, rebels attacked and killed acting Governor Bent and about ten other American officials. The wives of Bent and Kit Carson, however, managed to escape. Reacting quickly, a U.S. detachment under Colonel Sterling Price marched on Taos and attacked. The rebels retreated to a thick-walled adobe church. U.S. forces breached a wall and directed concentrated cannon fire into the church. About 150 of the rebels were killed, and 400 captured, following close fighting. During one trial, six rebels were arraigned and tried, of whom five were convicted of murder and one of treason. All six were hanged in April, 1847. A young traveler and later author, Lewis Hector Garrard, wrote the only eyewitness account of this trial and hanging. He criticized, "It certainly did appear to be a great assumption on the part of the Americans to conquer a country, and then arraign the revolting inhabitants for treason ... Treason, indeed! What did the poor devil know about his new allegiance? But so it was; and, as the jail was overstocked with others awaiting trial, it was deemed expedient to hasten the execution ... I left the room, sick at heart. Justice! out upon the word, when its distorted meaning is the warrant for murdering those who defend to the last their country and their homes." Additional executions followed to total at least 28.

Price fought three more engagements with the rebels, which included many Pueblo Indians, who wanted to push the Americans from the territory. By mid-February he had the revolt well under control. President James K. Polk promoted Price to a brevet rank of Brigadier General for his service. Total fatalities amounted to more than 300 New Mexican native rebels and about 30 Anglos, as non-Latino whites are commonly called in the southwest to this day.

Provisional government

Treaty of Guadalupe Hidalgo

Under the Treaty of Guadalupe Hidalgo of 1848, Mexico ceded much of its mostly unsettled northern holdings, today known as the American Southwest and California, to the United States of America in exchange for an end to hostilities, and the American evacuation of Mexico City and many other areas under its control. Under this treaty, Mexico recognized Texas as a part of the United States. Mexico also received $15 million cash, plus the assumption of slightly more than $3 million in outstanding Mexican debts.

New Mexico, the new name for the region between Texas and California, became a US territory. The Senate struck out Article X of the Treaty of Guadalupe Hidalgo, which said that vast land grants in New Mexico (nearly always gifts by the local authorities to their friends) would all be recognized. The treaty promised to protect the ownership rights of the heirs of the land grants. The decision to strike down Article X eventually led to court cases in which the US removed millions of acres of land, timber, and water from Mexican-issued land grants and placed them back in the public domain. But, Correia points out that the lands involved had typically never been occupied or controlled by the men who had the grants; most were in Indian-controlled areas.

The residents could choose whether they remain and receive United States citizenship or remove to Mexico and retain (or gain) Mexican citizenship. All but 1,000 or so settlers—who were mostly Mexican government officials—chose American citizenship, which included full voting rights. Because at the time only white men could vote in most states, the Mexicans were considered white under the law.

In later decades, as discrimination by whites increased in numerous areas in relation to growth in the number of Mexican immigrants, some states tried to classify Hispanics as black or colored, and thus exclude them from voting because of barriers to voter registration. These practices were challenged in the mid-20th century and resolved in a case that reached the US Supreme Court.(source?)

American Territory

The Congressional Compromise of 1850 halted a bid for statehood under a proposed antislavery constitution. Texas transferred eastern New Mexico to the federal government, settling a lengthy boundary dispute. Under the compromise, the American government established the New Mexico Territory on September 9, 1850. The territory, which included all of Arizona, New Mexico and parts of Colorado, officially established its capital at Santa Fe in 1851. The U.S. territorial New Mexico census of 1850 found 61,547 people living in all the territory of New Mexico. The people of New Mexico would determine whether to permit slavery under a proposed constitution at statehood, but the status of slavery during the territorial period provoked considerable debate. The granting of statehood was up to a Congress sharply divided on the slavery issue. Some (including Stephen A. Douglas) maintained that the territory could not restrict slavery, as under the earlier Missouri Compromise, while others (including Abraham Lincoln) insisted that older Mexican legal traditions, which forbade slavery, took precedence. Regardless of its official status, black slavery was rarely seen in New Mexico although Indian slavery was common. Statehood was finally granted to New Mexico on January 6, 1912.

Navajo and Apache raids and plundering led Kit Carson to abandon his intent to retire to a sheep ranch near Taos after the Mexican–American War. Carson accepted an 1853 appointment as U.S. Indian agent with a headquarters at Taos, and fought the Indians with notable success.

The United States acquired the southwestern boot heel of the state and southern Arizona below the Gila river in the mostly desert Gadsden Purchase of 1853. This purchase was desired when it was found that a much easier route for a proposed transcontinental railroad was located slightly south of the Gila river. This territory had not been explored or mapped when the Treaty of Guadalupe Hidalgo was negotiated in 1848. The ever-present Santa Anna was in power again in 1853 and needed the money from the Gadsden Purchase to fill his coffers and to pay the Mexican Army for that year. The Southern Pacific built the second transcontinental railroad though this purchased land in 1881.

In the United States House of Representatives the Committee of Thirty-Three on January 14, 1861, reported that it had reached majority agreement on a constitutional amendment to protect slavery where it existed and the immediate admission of New Mexico Territory as a slave state. This latter proposal would result in a de facto extension of the Missouri Compromise line for all existing territories below the line.
After the Peace Conference of 1861, a bill for New Mexico statehood was tabled by a vote of 115 to 71 with opposition coming from both Southerners and Republicans.

Media
The first newspaper in New Mexico was El Crepusculo de la Libertad  ("The Dawn of Liberty"), a Spanish-language paper founded in 1834 at Taos. The Santa Fe Republican, founded in 1847, was the first English-language newspaper. By 2000 the state had 18 daily newspapers, 13 Sunday newspapers, and 25 weekly newspapers. Today's daily papers include the Albuquerque Journal, the Santa Fe New Mexican (founded in 1849), the Las Cruces Sun-News, the Roswell Record, the Farmington Daily Times, and the Deming Headlight. The most widely broadcast radio station since its founding in 1922 has been KKOB (AM) in Albuquerque. With 50,000 watts of transmitter power on a clear channel it reaches audiences in most of New Mexico and parts of neighboring states. There are at least five television stations, based in Albuquerque, representing ABC, NBC, CBS, PBS, and Fox.

Civil War

During the American Civil War, Confederate troops from Texas commanded by Gen. Henry Sibley briefly occupied southern New Mexico in July 1861, pushing up the Rio Grande valley as far as Santa Fe by February 1862. Defeated in the Battle of Glorieta Pass, they were forced to withdraw south. Union troops from California under Gen. James Carleton re-captured the territory in August 1862. As Union troops were withdrawn to fight elsewhere, Kit Carson helped to organize and command the 1st New Mexican Volunteers to engage in campaigns against the Apache, Navajo, and Comanche in New Mexico and Texas as well as participating in the Battle of Valverde against the Confederates. Confederate troops withdrew after the Battle of Glorieta Pass where Union regulars, Colorado Volunteers (The Pikes Peakers), and New Mexican Volunteers defeated them. The Arizona Territory was split off as a separate territory in 1863.

After the Civil War, Congress passed the Peonage Act of 1867, aiming to abolish the historical system of peonage that had existed in New Mexico.

Indians
Centuries of continued conflict with the Apache and the Navajo continued to plague New Mexico. In 1864, the U.S. Army trapped and captured the main Navajo forces, forcing them onto a small reservation in eastern New Mexico in what is called the Long Walk of the Navajo, also called the Long Walk to Bosque Redondo. This put an end to their livestock raids on New Mexican farms, ranches, and Indian pueblos. After several years of severe hardships, during which many Navajos died, they were allowed in 1868 to return to most of their lands. Sporadic Apache small-scale raiding continued until Apache chief Geronimo finally was captured and imprisoned in 1886.

After the Civil War, the Army set up a chain of forts to protect the people and the caravans of commerce. Most tribes were relocated on reservations near the forts, where they were given food and supplies by the federal government. Often supplies and annuities were late, or food spoiled.

The new legal system and the legal profession
In the first half of the 19th century, Mexico set up a judicial system for its northernmost districts, in present-day New Mexico and California. There were no professionally trained lawyers or judges. Instead, there were numerous low-ranking legal roles such as notario, escribano, asesor, auditor de Querra, justicia mayor, procurador, and juez receptor. With the annexation by the United States in 1848, Congress set up an entirely new territorial legal systems, one that used the English language and American laws, forms, and procedures.  Practically all the lawyers and judges were new arrivals from the United States, as there was no place in the new system for the old Hispanic roles.

Elfego Baca (1865 – 1945) was an outlaw-turned-lawman, lawyer, and politician in New Mexico in the late 19th and early 20th centuries.  In 1888, after serving as a County Sheriff, Baca became a U.S. Marshal. He served for two years and then began studying law. In December 1894, he was admitted to the bar and practice law in New Mexico until 1904. he held numerous local political offices, and when New Mexico became a state in 1912, he was the unsuccessful Republican candidate for Congress. In the late 1950s, Walt Disney turned Baca into the first Hispanic popular culture hero in the United States, on 10 television shows, in six comic books, in a feature film, and in related merchandising. However, Disney deliberately avoided ethnic tension by presenting Baca as a generalized Western hero, portraying a standard hero similar to Davy Crockett, in Hispanic dress.

Las Gorras Blancas

After the Mexican–American War, Anglo Americans began migrating in large numbers to all of the newly acquired territory. Anglos began taking lands from both Native Americans and Nuevomexicanos by different means, most notably by squatting. Squatters often then sold these lands to land speculators for huge profits, especially after the passage of the 1862 Homestead Act encouraging development in the West. Nuevomexicanos demanded the return of their lands, but the governments did not respond favorably. For example, the Surveyor of General Claims Office on New Mexico would at times take up to fifty years to process a claim, meanwhile, the lands were being grabbed up by the newcomers. The first Surveyor General, William Pelham, had two translators assisting him: David Miller and David Whiting. But these two men seemingly did not cut into the fifty years needed to translate.

While the Santa Fe, Atchison, and Topeka railroad was built in the 1890s, speculators known as the Santa Fe Ring, orchestrated schemes to dislodge natives from their lands. In response, Nuevomexicanos gathered to reclaim lands taken by Anglos. Hoping to scare off the new immigrants, they eventually used intimidation and raids to accomplish their goals. They sought to develop a class-based consciousness among local people through the everyday tactics of resistance to the economic and social order confronting common property land grant communities. They called themselves Las Gorras Blancas, a name referring to the white head coverings many wore.

Gilded Age

In 1851 the Vatican appointed Jean-Baptiste Lamy (1814–1888), a French cleric, as bishop of the diocese of Santa Fe. There were only nine priests at first; Lamy brought in many more. In 1875 it was upgraded to the status of archdiocese, with supervision over Catholic affairs in New Mexico and Arizona. Lamy had St. Francis Cathedral built in a French style; the work was conducted between 1869 and 1886.

To provide the forts and reservations with food, the federal government contracted for thousands of head of cattle, and Texas cattlemen began entering New Mexico with their herds. Rancher Charles Goodnight blazed the first cattle trail through New Mexico in 1866, extending from the Pecos River northward into Colorado and Wyoming. Over it more than 250,000 head of cattle trailed to market. John Chisum also brought his herds up the Pecos. As employer of the desperado Billy the Kid, he figured prominently in the Lincoln County War of 1878–1880. This was one of the many struggles between cattle herders and territorial officials, among rival cattle barons, and between sheep ranchers and cattle ranchers during this period. The Butterfield Trail, the longest of the cattle trails, had its first important stop in New Mexico at Fort Fillmore. It began operations in 1858 and was superseded by railroad operations in 1881.

The Santa Fe Railroad reached New Mexico in 1878, with the first locomotive crossing Raton Pass that December. It reached Lamy, New Mexico, 16 miles (26 km) from Santa Fe in 1879 and Santa Fe itself in 1880, and Deming in 1881, thereby replacing the storied Santa Fe Trail as a way to ship cattle to market. The new town of Albuquerque, platted in 1880 as the Santa Fe Railroad extended westward, quickly enveloped the old town. The rival Southern Pacific was completed between the Rio Grande valley and the Arizona border in 1881.

From 1880 to 1910 the territory grew rapidly. With the coming of the railroad, many homesteaders moved to New Mexico. In 1886 the New Mexico Education Association of school teachers was organized; in 1889 small state colleges were established at Albuquerque, Las Cruces, and Socorro; and in 1891 the first effective public school law was passed. An irrigation project in the Pecos River valley in 1889 marked the first of many such projects to irrigate farms in the dry state. Discovery of artesian waters at Roswell in 1890 gave both farming and mining a boost. The power of the cattle barons faded as much land was fenced in at the expense of the open range. The cattle ranchers and sheep ranchers also learned to tolerate one other, and both the cattle and sheep industries expanded. Mining became even more important, especially gold and silver. Coal mining developed during the 1890s, primarily to supply the railroads, and oil was discovered in Eddy County in 1909. The population of New Mexico reached 195,000 in 1910.

Conflicting land claims led to bitter quarrels among the original and Spanish inhabitants, cattle ranchers, and newer homesteaders. Despite destructive overgrazing, ranching survived as a mainstay of the New Mexican economy.

Statehood

On January 6, 1912, after years of debate on whether the population of New Mexico was fully assimilated into American culture, or too immersed in corruption, President William Howard Taft twisted arms in Congress and it approved admission of New Mexico as the 47th state of the Union. The admission of neighboring Arizona on February 14, 1912, completed the contiguous 48 states. Thousands of Mexicans fled north during the extremely bloody civil war that broke out in Mexico in 1911. In 1916 Mexican military leader Pancho Villa led an invasion across the border into Columbus, New Mexico, where they burned some homes and killed several Americans.

New Mexico contributed some 17,000 soldiers to the armed services during World War I. Thousands more from the state fought for the Allies during World War II.

Artists and writers
When the mainline of the railroad bypassed Santa Fe, the city lost businesses and population. In the 20th century, American and British artists and writers, and retirees were attracted to the cultural richness of the area, the beauty of the landscapes, and dry warm climate. Local leaders took the opportunity to promote the city's heritage making it a tourist attraction. The city sponsored bold architectural restoration projects and erected new buildings according to traditional techniques and styles, thus creating the "Santa Fe style."   Edgar L. Hewett, founder and first director of the School of American Research and the Museum of New Mexico in Santa Fe, was a leading promoter. He began the Santa Fe Fiesta in 1919 and the Southwest Indian Fair in 1922 (now known as the Indian Market). When he tried to attract a summer program for Texas women, many artists rebelled saying the city should not promote artificial tourism at the expense of its artistic culture. The writers and artists formed the Old Santa Fe Association and defeated the plan. The old "mud city" - which short-sighted modernizers laughed at for its adobe houses - was transformed into a city proud of its peculiarities and its blend of tradition and modernity.

Nuevomexicanos

In the late 19th and early 20th centuries, the Anglos tried to regulate the Hispanics living in New Mexico to second-class social status, due to xenophobia and prejudice. Some of these Anglos were ethnocentric, deprecating Hispanic/Mexican culture and disputing the rights of the original inhabitants. Richard Nostrand claims that this treatment caused the Hispanics to construct a "Spanish American" identity in response to show allegiance to the US, in an early instance of expressing being American through ethnic identity, to avoid being labeled as "Mexican", and to distinguish themselves from recent Mexican immigrants.

World War I gave the Hispanics the opportunity to demonstrate American citizenship by participating in the war effort. Like the "new immigrants" in northeastern cities, who also constructed dual identities, members of the Nuevomexicano middle class exuberantly participated in the war effort. They melded images of their heritage with patriotic symbols of America, especially in the Spanish-language press. Nuevomexicano politicians and community leaders recruited the rural masses into the war cause overseas and on the home front, including the struggle for woman suffrage. Support from New Mexico's Anglo establishment aided their efforts. Their wartime contributions improved the conditions of minority citizenship for Nuevomexicanos but did not eliminate social inequality. For example, no Hispanics —not even the son of a politician— were allowed to be a member of a fraternity at the state university.

The Anglos and Hispanics cooperated because both prosperous and poor Hispanics could vote and they outnumbered the Anglos. Around 1920, the term "Spanish-American" replaced "Mexican" in polite society and in political debate. The new term served both the interests of both groups. For Spanish speakers, it evoked Spain, not Mexico, recalling images of a romantic colonial past and suggesting a future of equality in Anglo-dominated America. For Anglos, on the other hand, it was a useful term that upgraded the state's image, for the old image as a "Mexican" land suggested the violence and disorder associated with that country's civil war in the early 20th century. This had discouraged capital investment and set back the statehood campaign. The new term gave the impression that "Spanish Americans" belonged to a true "American" political culture, making the established order appear all the more democratic.

New arrivals

In the 20th century immigrants and migrants brought new skills, outlooks and values, modernizing the highly traditional culture of the state. They included Midwestern farmers who tried to cultivate humid-area crops to the desert climate, Texas oilmen, tuberculosis patients who sought healing in the dry air (before an appropriate antibiotic was discovered), artists who made Taos a national cultural center, New Dealers who sought to modernize the state as fast as possible and improve infrastructure, soldiers and airmen from all over who came for training at the many military bases, noted scientists who came to Los Alamos to build a super weapon, and stayed on, and retirees from colder climes. They brought money and new ideas. The state residents gradually adopted more of a standard national culture, losing some of its unique qualities.

The building for the State Supreme Court was constructed during the Great Depression as a WPA project, completed in 1937. It's an example of the numerous projects which the Democratic administration of President Franklin D. Roosevelt collaborated on with states in order to improve infrastructure, invest in facilities, and put people to work. Prior to that project, the Supreme Court met in the basement of the state capitol.

Women's suffrage

The suffrage movement in the state worked hard to get women the vote but were stymied by the conservatism of politicians and the Catholic Church. New Mexico's legislature was one of the last in 1920 to ratify the 19th Amendment to the U.S. Constitution. After it passed, there was quickly a dramatic increase in political participation by both Anglo and Hispanic women, as well as strong mobilization efforts by the major parties to gain the support of the female voters.

World War II
New Mexico proportionately suffered the loss of more servicemen than any other state in the nation. The state led in the national war bond drive and had fifty federal installations, including glider and bombardier training schools. The state rapidly modernized during the war, as 65,000 young men (and 700 young women) joined the services, where they received a wide range of technical training and saw the outside world, many for the first time. Federal spending brought wartime prosperity, along with high wages, jobs for everyone, rationing and shortages. Federal facilities have continued to be major contributors to the state's economy in the postwar years.

The top secret remote Los Alamos Research Center was developed in the mountains of New Mexico as a research facility, opening in 1943 for the purpose of developing the world's first atomic bomb. Teams of scientists and engineers were recruited to work on this project. The first test at Trinity Site in the desert of the Alamogordo Bombing and Gunnery Range, now known as White Sands Missile Range, 28 miles southeast of San Antonio, New Mexico, on July 16, 1945, ushered in the atomic age. New Mexico had become a center of world-class science.  High-altitude balloon experiments from Holloman Air Force Base caused debris found near Roswell, New Mexico (The Roswell Incident) in 1947. This reputedly led to the persistent (but unproven) claims by a few individuals that the government had captured and concealed extraterrestrial corpses and equipment.

Albuquerque expanded rapidly after the war. The state quickly emerged as a leader in nuclear, solar, and geothermal energy research and development. The Sandia National Laboratories, founded in 1949, carried out nuclear research and special weapons development at Kirtland Air Force Base south of Albuquerque and at Livermore, California.

Environmentalism
Since the late 19th century, New Mexico and other arid Western states have sought to assert sovereign control over water allocation policies within their boundaries. In the 1990s the legislature debated H.R. 128, the proposed State Water Sovereignty Protection Act. Since the passage of the Newlands Act in 1902, Western states have benefited from federal water projects. In spite of these projects, water allocation remained a politically charged issue throughout the 20th century. Most states have sought to limit federal control over water distribution, preferring instead to allocate water under the discredited doctrine of prior appropriation.

As a state dependent on both smokestack industry and scenic tourism, New Mexico was at the center of the debates over clean air legislation, particularly the Clean Air Act of 1967 and its amendments in 1970 and 1977. The Kennecott Copper Corporation, which operated a large smelter at Hurley, New Mexico, generating as a byproduct thick clouds of air pollution, led the opposition to the environmentalists, represented by the New Mexico Citizens for Clean Air and Water. Eventually the company was forced to comply with fairly strict federal standards. They often delayed the compliance process for years by threatening economic repercussions, such as plant closings and unemployment, if forced to comply with standards.

See also

Governor of New Mexico
List of governors of New Mexico
List of Mexican governors of New Mexico
List of Spanish governors of New Mexico
History of New Mexico
History of slavery in New Mexico
List of counties in New Mexico
List of ghost towns in New Mexico
List of municipalities in New Mexico
Indigenous peoples of the North American Southwest
Southwestern archaeology
Territorial evolution of New Mexico
Santa Fe de Nuevo México
U.S. provisional government of New Mexico
Territory of New Mexico
State of New Mexico
Timeline of New Mexico history
Timeline of Albuquerque, New Mexico

References

Further reading

Surveys
 Bancroft, Hubert Howe. The Works of Hubert Howe Bancroft, Vol. XVII. (History of Arizona and New Mexico 1530–1888) (1889); reprint 1962. online edition
 Beck, Warren and Haase, Ynez. Historical Atlas of New Mexico 1969.
 Beck, Warren. New Mexico: A History of Four Centuries (1962), standard survey
 Bullis, Don, New Mexico: A Biographical Dictionary, 1540–1980, 2 vol, (Los Ranchos de Albuquerque: Rio Grande, 2008) 393 pp. 
 Chavez, Thomas E. An Illustrated History of New Mexico, 267 pages, University of New Mexico Press 2002, 
 DeMark, Judy, ed. Essays in 20th Century New Mexico History (1994)
Etulain, Richard W., ed. New Mexican Lives: Profiles and Historical Stories (2002)
 Sanchez, Joseph P. Robert L. Spude and Arthur R. Gomez. New Mexico: A History (U of Oklahoma Press, 2013) 384pp
Simmons, Marc. New Mexico: An Interpretive History, 221 pages, University of New Mexico Press 1988, short introduction
 Szasz, Ferenc M. Larger Than Life: New Mexico in the Twentieth (2nd ed. 2006).
 Weber, David J. “The Spanish Borderlands, Historiography Redux.” The History Teacher, 39#1 (2005), pp. 43–56., online.
 Weigle, Marta, ed. Telling New Mexico: A New History (2009)  483 . wide range of readings   online review

Special studies
 Bronstein, Jamie L. "'Selling Sunshine': Land Development and Politics in Postwar Southern New Mexico." New Mexico Historical Review 85.3 (2010).
 Brown, Tracy L. Pueblo Indians and Spanish Colonial Authority in Eighteenth Century New Mexico. University of Arizona Press, 2013.
 Carleton, William R. Fruit, Fiber, and Fire: A History of Modern Agriculture in New Mexico (U of Nebraska Press, 2021).
 Carlson, Alvar Ward. "New Mexico's Sheep Industry: 1850–1900, Its Role in the History of the Territory." New Mexico Historical Review 44.1 (1969). online
 Carnett, Daniel R. Contending for the Faith: Southern Baptists in New Mexico. (2002)  230pp. 
 Getz; Lynne Marie Schools of Their Own: The Education of Hispanos in New Mexico, 1850–1940 (1997) online edition
Erlinda Gonzales-Berry, David R. Maciel, editors, The Contested Homeland: A Chicano History of New Mexico, 314 pages – University of New Mexico Press 2000, 
 Forrest, Suzanne. The Preservation of the Village: New Mexico's Hispanics and the New Deal (1998) online edition
 González; Nancie L. The Spanish-Americans of New Mexico: A Heritage of Pride (1969) online edition
 González, Deena J. Refusing the Favor: The Spanish-Mexican Women of Santa Fe, 1820–1880 (1999) online edition
 Gutiérrez; Ramón A. When Jesus Came, the Corn Mothers Went Away: Marriage, Sexuality, and Power in New Mexico, 1500–1846 (1991) online edition
 Hain; F. Paul L. Chris Garcia, Gilbert K. St. Clair; New Mexico Government 3rd ed. (1994) online edition
 Holtby, David V. "Historical Reflections on New Mexico Statehood: New Mexico's Economy; A Case Study of Mining to 1940," New Mexico Historical Review, (Winter 2013), 88#1 pp 65–94.
 Holtby, David V.  Forty-Seventh Star: New Mexico's Struggle for Statehood (2013) online review
 Tony Hillerman, The Great Taos Bank Robbery and other Indian Country Affairs, University of New Mexico Press, Albuquerque, 1973, trade paperback, 147 pages,, stories
 Holmes, Jack E. Politics in New Mexico (1967)
 Holtby, David V. Forty-Seventh Star: New Mexico's Struggle for Statehood (U. of Oklahoma Press; 2012) 362 pages; examines the struggle for statehood in the context of wider politics from 1848 to 1912.
 Paul Horgan, Great River, The Rio Grande in North American History, 1038 pages, Wesleyan University Press 1991, 4th Reprint, Pulitzer Prize 1955
 Hornung, Chuck. Cipriano Baca, Frontier Lawman of New Mexico (McFarland, 2013) 285 pp. 
 Kern, Robert W. Labor in New Mexico: Strikes, Unions, and Social History, 1881–1981, University of New Mexico Press 1983, 
 Lamar; Howard R. The Far Southwest, 1846–1912: A Territorial History (1966, repr 2000)
 Larson, Robert W. New Mexico's Quest for Statehood, 1846–1912 (1968)
 Nieto-Phillips, John M. The Language of Blood: The Making of Spanish-American Identity in New Mexico, 1880s–1930s, University of New Mexico Press 2004, 
 Pickens, William. "The New Deal in New Mexico," in John Braeman et al. eds. The New Deal: Volume Two - the State and Local Levels (1975) pp 311–54
 Resendez, Andres. Changing National Identities at the Frontier: Texas and New Mexico, 1800–1850 (2005) 309pp 
 Sánchez; George I. Forgotten People: A Study of New Mexicans (1940; reprint 1996)
 Szasz, Ferenc M.; and Richard W. Etulain; Religion in Modern New Mexico (1997) online edition
 Trujillo, Michael L.  Land of Disenchantment: Latina/o Identities and Transformations in Northern New Mexico (2010) 265 pages; An experimental ethnography that contrasts life in the Espanola Valley with the state's commercial image as the "land of enchantment."
 Weber, David J. The Mexican Frontier, 1821–1846: The American Southwest under Mexico (1982) online edition
 Scott, David Settino "What is a Plaza Rat?", 2013. primary sources (2013)

Primary sources
 Andrews, Martha Shipman and Richard A. Melzer, eds. The Whole Damned World: New Mexico Aggies at War, 1941–1945; World War II Correspondence of Dean Daniel B. Jett (2008)
 Ellis, Richard, ed. New Mexico Past and Present: A Historical Reader. 1971.
 Santa Fe Trail Bibliography - Kansas Historical Society
 Weber, David J. Foreigners in Their Native Land: Historical Roots of the Mexican Americans (1973), primary sources to 1912

 
New Mexico
History of the Rocky Mountains